Ali Zeinali is an Iranian footballer who plays for Oxin Alborz in the Azadegan League.

Club career
Zeinali has played his entire career for Saipa F.C.

 Assists

International
In 2010, Zeinali was selected to participate in Iran U-23 football team's training camp in Poland.

References

1988 births
Living people
Saipa F.C. players
Iranian footballers
Footballers at the 2010 Asian Games
Association football midfielders
Asian Games competitors for Iran
People from Tehran Province